Ashok Nagar is a locality (township) of Allahabad, Uttar Pradesh, India.

Notable residents 

 Mahadevi Varma

References 

Neighbourhoods in Allahabad